Horace Orlando Bloomfield (15 July 1891 – 31 May 1973) was an English cricketer. He played four first-class matches for Surrey between 1921 and 1922, scoring an unbeaten 107 on debut against Northamptonshire.

In 1909 at the Private Banks Sports Ground Bloomfield had a successful season with the bat. In 1927 he played for a Lloyds Bank XI.

See also
 List of Surrey County Cricket Club players

References

External links
 

1891 births
1973 deaths
English cricketers
Surrey cricketers
People from Brixton
Cricketers from Greater London